Felipe Andrés Barrientos Mena (born 6 March 1997) is a Chilean professional footballer who plays as a forward for Chilean Primera División side Coquimbo Unido.

Club career
A product of Universidad Católica youth system, on second half 2015 he moved to Mexico at the age of 18 and joined Celaya in the Ascenso MX, being loaned to Irapuato in the Liga Premier. In 2017, he returned to Chile to join Palestino. After his steps for Palestino, Huachipato, Deportes La Serena and Curicó Unido, he joined Coquimbo Unido for the 2022 season.

International career
During 2016, he was frequently called up to Chile U20. Prior to this, he was a sparring player of Chile senior team while preparing 2015 Copa América.

Honours
Palestino
 Copa Chile (1): 2018

References

External links
 
 
 Felipe Barrientos at playmakerstats.com (English version of ceroacero.es)

1997 births
Living people
Footballers from Santiago
Chilean footballers
Chilean expatriate footballers
Chile under-20 international footballers
Association football forwards
Club Celaya footballers
Irapuato F.C. footballers
Club Deportivo Palestino footballers
C.D. Huachipato footballers
Deportes La Serena footballers
Curicó Unido footballers
Coquimbo Unido footballers
Ascenso MX players
Liga Premier de México players
Chilean Primera División players
Expatriate footballers in Mexico
Chilean expatriate sportspeople in Mexico